Langmead is a surname. Notable people with the surname include:

 Richard Langmead (born 1972), former rugby union player.
 Thomas Pitt Taswell-Langmead (1840–1882), English barrister and academic.
 Kelvin Langmead (born 1985), English professional footballer.
 Ben Langmead, a computational biologist at Johns Hopkins University. 
 Philip Langmead (c.1739-1816), member of Parliament for Plymouth.